Lampides is a genus of butterflies in the family Lycaenidae.

It currently consists of one species: Lampides boeticus (Linnaeus, 1767), the peablue or long-tailed blue. Lampides used to contain other species, most of which have now been moved to the genus Jamides.

External links

 Lampides boeticus at Captain's European Butterfly Guide
 Lampides boeticus Archived link

 
Lycaenidae genera